Lloyd Warbey is an English television presenter, actor, performer and host of the reboot of the programme Art Attack (2012–2015).

Early life 
Lloyd completed his professional training at the East 15 acting school in Essex. Here, he developed a passion for theatre, performance and live entertainment.

Career 
Lloyd has performed in UK tours of Joseph & the Amazing Technicolor Dreamcoat, The Jungle Book, Peter Pan and Shakespeare In Rep. He is an ambassador for the Lennox Children's Cancer Fund Charity.

Warbey previously worked in a school in Thurrock, the Hathaway Academy, as a supply teacher.

Workshops 
Lloyd hosts interactive arts & crafts workshops for children aged 3+ (under the name "CraftShopWorkshops" of which he is a patron). They focus on getting families to be creative and working with local communities, offering a variety of activities.

Events have included: Fun Club (Weston Favell Shopping Centre & West Orchards Shopping Center), Kids Fest 2016 (Marsh Farm), Carnival Festival Day (Fernham Hall), The BFT Summer camp (Havering Council) and Modesh World (Dubai).

References

English television presenters
Living people
Year of birth missing (living people)